Caitlan Johnston (born 12 January 2001) is an Australian rugby league footballer who plays for the Newcastle Knights in the NRL Women's Premiership. 

Primarily a er, she previously played for the Sydney Roosters and has represented the Indigenous All Stars and Prime Minister's XIII.

Background
Born in Belmont, New South Wales, Johnston is of Indigenous Australian descent and began playing rugby league for Windale at age 11.

Playing career
In 2018 and 2019, Johnston played for the Newcastle Knights in the Tarsha Gale Cup, captaining the side in 2019. 

She scored a try and was named Player of the Match. In July 2019, Johnston joined the Sydney Roosters NRL Women's Premiership team.

In Round 1 of the 2019 NRL Women's season, she made her debut for the Roosters in their 12–16 loss to the New Zealand Warriors. On 25 October 2019, she was named 18th player for Australia for their Test match against New Zealand.

In March 2020, Johnston joined the Central Coast Roosters NSWRL Women's Premiership team. Johnston suffered a knee injury while playing for the Central Coast and was ruled out of the 2020 NRL Women's season.

On 20 February 2021, she represented the Indigenous All Stars in their 24–0 loss to the Māori All Stars.

On 1 July 2021, Johnston was announced as the Newcastle Knights' first ever NRLW signing. In February 2022, she was announced as one of the club captains.

In round 1 of the delayed 2021 NRL Women's season, Johnston made her club debut for the Knights against the Parramatta Eels.

In late September 2022, Johnston was named in the Dream Team announced by the Rugby League Players Association. The team was selected by the players, who each cast one vote for each position.

On 2 October 2022, Johnston played in the Knights' 32-12 NRLW Grand Final win over the Parramatta Eels.

References

External links
Newcastle Knights profile
NRL profile

2001 births
Living people
Indigenous Australian rugby league players
Australian female rugby league players
Australia women's national rugby league team players
Rugby league second-rows
Rugby league props
Rugby league locks
Sydney Roosters (NRLW) players
Newcastle Knights (NRLW) players